Daniel Esteban Buitrago Tamayo (born February 27, 1991), or simply Daniel Buitrago, is a Colombian former professional football player.

He made his Russian Premier League debut for PFC Spartak Nalchik on 18 March 2012 in a game against FC Krylia Sovetov Samara.

References

External links
 
 

1991 births
Living people
Footballers from Medellín
Colombian footballers
Colombia under-20 international footballers
FK Spartaks Jūrmala players
PFC Spartak Nalchik players
Llaneros F.C. players
Cortuluá footballers
Independiente Santa Fe footballers
C.D. Universidad Católica del Ecuador footballers
América de Cali footballers
Atlético Venezuela C.F. players
C.D. Sonsonate footballers
Russian Premier League players
Categoría Primera A players
Categoría Primera B players
Venezuelan Primera División players
Ecuadorian Serie A players
Colombian expatriate footballers
Colombian expatriate sportspeople in Russia
Colombian expatriate sportspeople in Latvia
Colombian expatriate sportspeople in Venezuela
Colombian expatriate sportspeople in Ecuador
Colombian expatriate sportspeople in El Salvador
Expatriate footballers in Russia
Expatriate footballers in Latvia
Expatriate footballers in Venezuela
Expatriate footballers in Ecuador
Expatriate footballers in El Salvador
Association football forwards